During the 1995–96 English football season, Leicester City F.C. competed in the Football League First Division.

Season summary
Mark McGhee left the club unexpectedly in December 1995 whilst Leicester were top of Division One to take charge of Wolverhampton Wanderers. McGhee was replaced by Martin O'Neill. Under O'Neill, Leicester qualified for the 1995–96 Division One promotion playoffs and beat Crystal Palace 2–1 with a last-gasp Steve Claridge goal securing an immediate return to the Premiership.

Final league table

Results
Leicester City's score comes first

Legend

Football League First Division

First Division play-offs

FA Cup

League Cup

Squad

References

Leicester City F.C. seasons
Leicester City